The Birmingham Handsworth by-election was held  on 16 November 1950.  It was held due to the death of the incumbent Conservative Party MP Harold Roberts.  It was won by the Conservative Edward Boyle.

References

Handsworth
1950 in England
1950 elections in the United Kingdom
1950s in Birmingham, West Midlands